Jeffrey Mursau (June 12, 1954) is a Wisconsin politician, legislator and business owner.

Born in Oconto Falls, Wisconsin, Mursau owned his business and served as president of the village of Crivitz, Wisconsin. Mursau has served in the Wisconsin State Assembly since 2005.

References

People from Oconto Falls, Wisconsin
1954 births
Living people
21st-century American politicians
People from Crivitz, Wisconsin
Republican Party members of the Wisconsin State Assembly